Collegiate School may refer to:

Educational institutions

Australia
The Collegiate School of St Peter, a private Anglican boys' school in Adelaide, Australia. Commonly known as St Peter's College
St Michael's Collegiate School, a private Anglican girls' day and boarding primary, intermediate and high school in Hobart, Australia
St Peter's Collegiate Girls' School, a private Anglican girls' school in Adelaide, Australia. Commonly known as St Peter's Girls' School

Bangladesh
Rajshahi Collegiate School, First and oldest school in Bangladesh
Chittagong Collegiate School, A School in Chittagong, Bangladesh

Jamaica
Collegiate School (Jamaica), a school in Kingston

New Zealand
Sir Edmund Hillary Collegiate a public primary, middle and high school in South Auckland, New Zealand
St Paul's Collegiate School, a private Anglican day and boarding high school in Hamilton, New Zealand
St Matthew's Collegiate School, a state integrated Anglican girls' day and boarding intermediate and high school in Masterton, New Zealand
Samuel Marsden Collegiate School, a private Anglican girls' primary, intermediate and high school in Wellington, New Zealand
Wanganui Collegiate School, a state integrated Anglican coed high school in Whanganui, New Zealand
St Hilda's Collegiate School, an Anglican state integrated girls' day and boarding intermediate and high school in Dunedin, New Zealand

United Kingdom
Bournemouth Collegiate School, Bournemouth, United Kingdom
Collegiate School, Bristol, United Kingdom (formerly Colston's and Colston’s Collegiate School)
Hull Collegiate School, Kingston upon Hull, United Kingdom
North London Collegiate School, Edgware, London
Sheffield Collegiate School, Sheffield, United Kingdom

United States
The Collegiate School (1701–1718), original name for Yale University
Collegiate School (New York), an independent school for boys in New York City
Collegiate School (New Jersey), a private coeducational day school in Passaic County, New Jersey
Collegiate School (Richmond, Virginia), a preparatory school in Richmond, Virginia
Collegiate High School (Lakeland, Florida), a charter high school located on the Lakeland, Florida campus of Polk State College
Collegiate High School at Northwest Florida State College, a school in Niceville, Florida
State College of Florida Collegiate School, a school in Bradenton, Florida

Other uses
Collegiate institute, an institution of secondary or postsecondary education; used primarily in Canada